Wazirzada (meaning son of Wazir) are descendants of the Grand Wazirs of the Sadduzai Dynasty in Afghanistan. Wazirzadas are Sadozai Durranis; also a sub tribe of Popalzais and therefore belong to the Abdali or Durrani group of Pashtun tribes.

References

Further reading
Brig.(R) Rashid, Haroon (2002). History of Phatans.Vol1; The Sarabani Phatans: Printo Graphics, Islamabad, Pakistan. (arguably the most authentic account of the History of Pathans in general and of Wazirzadas in particular.)
Saddozai, Wazirzada Abdul Qaiyum Khan (2000). A History of the Saddozai Kings of Afghanistan. Faqir Jan Printing Press Peshawar
Wg.Cdr.(R) Saddozai, Sardar Ahmed Shah Jan. Saddozai Kings & Viziers of Afghanistan 1747 - 1842 and Vazier Usman Khan Kamran Khel's Progeny: The Sardar Khel's of Peshawar.

Noble titles
Ethnic groups in Afghanistan
Durrani Pashtun tribes